is a 1984 Japanese film directed by Toshiharu Ikeda. At the 6th Yokohama Film Festival it won three awards.

Synopsis
When a fisherman stands in the way of an industrial scheme, the business developers have him murdered. His wife Migiwa, a pearl diver, plots to avenge his death.

Cast 
 Mari Shirato as Migiwa Saeki
 Jun Etō as Saeki Keisuke
 Kentarō Shimizu as Miyamoto Shouhei
 Seiji Miyaguchi as Tatsuo
 Junko Miyashita as Natsuko
 Yoshirō Aoki as Terumasa Miyamoto
 Takashi Kanda as Lawyer Hanaoka
 Hiroko Seki as Nobu

Awards and nominations 
6th Yokohama Film Festival. 
Won: Best Director - Toshiharu Ikeda
Won: Best Actress - Mari Shirato
Won: Best Cinematography - Yonezou Maeda
4th Best Film

References

External links 
 
 Mermaid Legend at Allcinema.net

1984 films
Films directed by Toshiharu Ikeda
1980s Japanese-language films
1980s Japanese films